Thomas (Tom) Homco (born January 8, 1970 in Hammond, Indiana) is a former American football linebacker. He played for four seasons with the Los Angeles/St. Louis Rams. He played college football for Northwestern University.  Prior to that, he led Highland High School to its only Indiana State Championship game in 1987, which was a 14-7 loss to Indianapolis Ben Davis.

References

1970 births
American football linebackers
St. Louis Rams players
Los Angeles Rams players
Northwestern Wildcats football players
Living people